The Oghuz languages are a sub-branch of the Turkic language family, spoken by approximately 108 million people. The three languages with the largest number of speakers are Turkish, Azerbaijani and Turkmen, which, combined, account for more than 95% of speakers.

Kara-Khanid scholar Mahmud al-Kashgari, who lived in the 11th century, stated that the Oghuz language was the simplest among all Turkic languages.

Swedish turcologist and linguist Lars Johanson notes that Oghuz languages form a clearly discernible and closely related bloc within the Turkic language family as the cultural and political history of the speakers of Oghuz languages has linked them more closely up to the modern age.

History and terminology
The ancestor of Oghuz languages is a matter of debate. The language of the oldest stone monuments such as Orkhon inscriptions, and documents such as Old Uyghur manuscripts are rather the ancestor of Karluk and Kipchak Turkic languages. Oghuz languages apparently originate from the language of the people known as "Western Turgut" in Chinese annals. Old Anatolian and Old Ottoman languages, which are written Middle Turkic, would be the most ancient within the Oghuz group of Turkic languages.
 
The term "Oghuz" is applied to the southwestern branch of the Common Turkic languages. It is in reference to the Oghuz Turks, who migrated from the Altay Mountains to Central Asia in the 8th century and further expanded to the Middle East and to the Balkans as separate tribes.

Classification
The Oghuz languages currently spoken have been classified into three categories based on their features and geography: Western, Eastern, and Southern.

Two further languages, Crimean Tatar and Urum, are Kipchak languages, but have been heavily influenced by the Oghuz languages.

The extinct Pecheneg language was probably Oghuz, but as it is poorly documented, it is difficult to further classify it within the Oghuz family; it is therefore usually excluded from classification.

Features
The Oghuz languages share a number of features that have led linguists to classify them together. Some of the features are shared with other Turkic languages, and others are unique to the Oghuz family.

Swedish turcologist and linguist Lars Johanson notes that Oghuz languages form a clearly discernible and closely related bloc within the Turkic language family as the cultural and political history of the speakers of Oghuz languages has linked them more closely up to the modern age.

Shared features
Loss of initial *h sound (shared with all Turkic languages but Khalaj)
Loss of productivity of the original Turkic instrumental case -n (shared with all Turkic languages but Yakut and Khalaj)

Unique features
Voicing of stops (e.g. Anatolian Turkish gök < Ottoman گوك gök < Proto-Turkic kȫk, "sky"; Anatolian dağ < Ottoman طاغ  dağ < PTrk tāg "mountain")
Loss of  after  (e.g. quru < quruq, "dry", sarɯ < sarɯɣ, "yellow")
Change in form of participial from -gan to -an

Comparison
The remarkable similarity between Oghuz languages may be demonstrated through a sentence, which employs a verbal noun in the dative as a link between the main verb and auxiliary. This feature is universally shared by all Oghuz languages. Turcologist Julian Rentzsch uses this particular sentence in his work titled "Uniformity and diversity in Turkic inceptive constructions":

English: ‘The dead man rose, sat down and began to speak.’

Turkish: Ölü doğrulup oturdu ve konuşmaya başladı.
Turkmen: Öli ýerinden galyp oturdy-da, geplemäge başlady.
Azerbaijani: Ölü durub oturdu və danışmağa başladı.
Gagauz: Ölü oturdu da bašladï lafetmää.

Literary works
 Book of Dede Korkut
 Epic of Köroğlu
 Târîh-i Âli Selçûk (History of the House of Seljuk) by Yazıcıoğlu Ali
 Şikâyetnâme (شکايت نامه; "Complaint") by Fuzûlî
 Dâstân-ı Leylî vü Mecnûn by Fuzûlî
 Risâletü'n-Nushiyye by Yunus Emre
 Mârifetnâme (معرفت‌نامه; "Book of Gnosis") by İbrahim Hakkı Erzurumi

See also

 Oghuz Turks
 Turkic languages
 Turkic peoples
 Turkomans

References

Further reading
 

 
Agglutinative languages
Vowel-harmony languages
Oghuz Turks
Turkic languages